Harisinh Pratapsinh Chavda (30 October 1930 – 29 June 2013) was a member of the 14th Lok Sabha of India. He represented the Banaskantha constituency of Gujarat and is a member of the Indian National Congress.

A brief introduction
He was born in the village called Ambod, Dist. Gandhinagar, Gujarat, India on 30 October 1930.
His high school education was at Killol - Patan, Gujarat, India.
He was a Member, Gujarat Legislative Assembly for two terms between 1975–1985.
He was a cabinet minister, Government of Gujarat from 1975 to 1980.
He was a member of Indian Parliament from 1991 to 1995.
He is also a sitting member in 14th parliament since 2004.
He is a Member of Indian National Committee on Human Resource Development.
He is widely travelled and has visited Austria, Belgium, Canada, France, Germany, Italy, Netherlands, Switzerland, U.K, and U.S.A.

Founder

Lokniketan and from this platform,   started three colleges ten High Schools, five ashram shalas, eight hostels, kindergartens, 
 
Founded "Nootan Bharati" Institute at Taluka Palanpur then handed over its management to the local people. Started Thakkarbapa and Sarvajanik Chhatralaya at Palanpur.

External links
 Official biographical sketch in Parliament of India website
 He is a founder of Lokniketan, a renowned non-profit organization in Gujarat

1930 births
2013 deaths
People from Gandhinagar
Indian National Congress politicians from Gujarat
Lok Sabha members from Gujarat
India MPs 2004–2009
India MPs 1991–1996